KAVO or Kavo may refer to:

 KAVO (FM), a radio station (90.9 FM) licensed to Pampa, Texas, United States
 Avon Park Executive Airport's IATA code
 Kavo, a minor character in The Emperor's New School

People with the surname
 Havila Kavo, Papua New Guinean politician